Krishan Kant Paul (born 6 February 1948) is a former Indian Police Service officer, who served as the Commissioner of Police, Delhi from February 2004 to July 2007. Following his retirement from the IPS, he served as the Governor of several states—Meghalaya (2013–15), Manipur (2014-15) and Uttarakhand (2015–18). He had also held the governorships of Mizoram and Nagaland briefly, as additional charges.

Early life and background
Paul was born on 6 February 1948. He did his post-graduation (Master of Science) in Chemistry from Punjab University, Chandigarh. This was followed by his Ph.D. thesis in fluorine chemistry, which was highly commended and resulted in 15 research publications of a technical nature, in international scientific journals of repute.

Career

As an IPS officer
Paul has experience working in the Intelligence Bureau (IB) and the Research and Analysis Wing (RAW). He was the longest serving Police Commissioner of Delhi from February 2004 to July 2007.

As a member of UPSC
After retiring from police service, Paul became a member of the Union Public Service Commission, New Delhi on 26 July 2007. He served there until July 2013.

As the Governor of states
On 2 July 2013, Paul was appointed the new Governor of Meghalaya. He joined on 8 July 2013. On 2 July 2014, he was sworn in as Governor of Nagaland. He was given the additional charge as the Governor of Nagaland.

On 16 September 2014, Paul was sworn in as the Governor of Mizoram. Mizoram was assigned to him as additional charge. On 17 September 2014, he was sworn in as the Governor of Manipur. Manipur was assigned to him as an additional charge.

Paul was sworn in as the 6th Governor of Uttarakhand on 8 January 2015 replacing Aziz Qureshi, who was sent to take charge as the new Governor of Mizoram. This challenged Narendra Modi's government's attempts to make  Governors appointed during the UPA regime resign.

Personal life
Paul is married to Omita Paul, a former Indian Information Service officer, who was posted as secretary to former President Pranab Mukherjee, having worked with him, in different capacities since the 1980s.

References

|-

|-

|-

|-

|-

Living people
Governors of Meghalaya
Governors of Manipur
Governors of Uttarakhand
Governors of Nagaland
1948 births
Panjab University alumni
Commissioners of Delhi Police
Chiefs of police
Indian Police Service officers
People of the Research and Analysis Wing
21st-century Indian politicians
Governors of Mizoram